Rolf Einar Fife (born 18 October 1961) is a Norwegian diplomat.

He is a law graduate by education and started working for the Norwegian Ministry of Foreign Affairs in 1986. He served as head of department from 1997 and deputy under-secretary of state from 2002 to 2014. He then served as the Norwegian ambassador to France from 2014 to 2018 and to the European Union from 2019.

References

1961 births
Living people
Norwegian civil servants
Ambassadors of Norway to France
Ambassadors of Norway to the European Union